Ambulyx regia is a species of moth of the family Sphingidae. It is found in the Guangxi region of China.

References

Ambulyx
Moths described in 2006
Moths of Asia